Circle Bakote is a cluster of Union Councils in the eastern part of  Abbottabad District in the North-West Frontier Province of Pakistan.  Circle Bakote is located on the upper and west bank of the Jhelum River at Kohalla Bridge. The region is somewhere between 65 kilometres and 90 kilometres northwest of Islamabad. "Bakote" means the "land of forts". The Kanhar and Jehlum rivers are the two main rivers in Circle Bakote. Famous hill stations in the area are Miran Jani, Mukeshpuri, Thandiani, Pather Gali, Ayubia, Khanas Pur and Nathia Gali.

References 

Abbottabad District
Hindkowan tribes